This is a list of RPM magazine's Rock/Alternative number-one singles of its entire publication from June 11, 1995, to November 6, 2000. There are also some records listed.

Records

Consecutive weeks at #1
The Tragically Hip – "Poets" (12)
Marcy Playground – "Sex and Candy (7)
Filter – "Take a Picture" (7)
U2 – "Beautiful Day" (7)
The Wallflowers – "Heroes" (6)
The Tea Party – "Heaven Coming Down" (6)
Foo Fighters – "Learn to Fly" (6)
Red Hot Chili Peppers – "Otherside" (6)

Non-consecutive weeks at #1
3 Doors Down – "Kryptonite" (10)
Marcy Playground – "Sex and Candy" (8)
Filter – "Take a Picture" (8)
Foo Fighters – "Learn to Fly" (7)
Soundgarden – "Pretty Noose" (6)
Days of the New – "Enemy" (6)
Smash Mouth – "Walkin' on the Sun" (5)

Most songs to reach #1
The Smashing Pumpkins (5)
Red Hot Chili Peppers (5)
U2 (5)
Green Day (4)
Oasis (4)
Bush (3)
Pearl Jam (3)
Everclear (3)

Cumulative weeks at #1
Red Hot Chili Peppers (20)
U2 (18)
Tragically Hip (13)
Smashing Pumpkins (10)
Soundgarden (9)

Additionally, "Anybody Seen My Baby?" by The Rolling Stones is the only song to ever have debuted at the top spot.

Chart history

See also

List of RPM number-one alternative rock singles of 1995
List of RPM number-one alternative rock singles of 1996

References
Citations

External links
 Read about RPM Magazine at the AV Trust
 Search RPM charts here at Library and Archives Canada

Alternative
Alternative Rock
1990s in Canadian music
2000s in Canadian music